Hugh Robinson Whitehead  (11 November  1899 – 13 March 1983) was a New Zealand biochemist, microbiologist and scientific administrator. He was born in Leeds, Yorkshire, England, in 1899. He was the director of the Dairy Research Institute in Palmerston North.

In the 1964 Queen's Birthday Honours, Whitehead was appointed an Officer of the Order of the British Empire.

References

1899 births
1983 deaths
New Zealand biochemists
English emigrants to New Zealand
New Zealand microbiologists
New Zealand Officers of the Order of the British Empire